Dalaas is a municipality in the district of Bludenz in the Austrian state of Vorarlberg.

Population

Mayor
Since 2005 Christian Gantner (* 1980) is the mayor.

See also
 Horizon Field

References

Cities and towns in Bludenz District